Euthalia omeia is a butterfly of the family Nymphalidae (Limenitidinae). It is endemic to China.

References

omeia
Butterflies described in 1891